Anwar Mohammadbhai Agewan (4 December 1936 – 6 July 1991) was a Gujarati biographer, folklorist and editor from India. Born in Akola and educated in Gujarat and Bombay, he edited several publications. He wrote on religious thought and various saints of Gujarat.

Biography
Agewan was born on 4 December 1936 in Akola (now in Maharashtra, India). He completed his primary and secondary education in Shivrajgadh and Gondal respectively. He passed matriculation from Bombay. He obtained a graduation from Agra Hindi Vidyapith. He worked with Jay Gujarat and Rooplekha weeklies in Bombay. He also edited Aastha magazine.

He died on 6 July 1991.

Works
He wrote works on religious thoughts such as Vedsahityano Parichay (1965), story collection Advaita (1974), Sadhna ane Sakshatkar (1989), Chinmaya Gayatri (1989).

Rahiman Ane Jamal (1952), Girdhar Kaviray (1952), Sai Deendarvesh (1953), Sant Deendayalgiri (1954), Dasi Jeevan (1956), Kavi Gang (1954), Sant Dadu (1987, on Dadu Dayal) are works on saints of Gujarat while Rannade (1966), Rajasthanni Rasdhar (1974) and Kasumbino Rang (1988) are compilations of folk literature of western India.

See also 

 List of Gujarati-language writers

References

External links 
 

Gujarati-language writers
Indian editors
Indian biographers
People from Akola
1936 births
1991 deaths
Indian folklorists
Indian religious writers